João Gabriel Martins Peglow (born 7 January 2002) is a Brazilian professional footballer who plays as an attacking midfielder for Dnipro-1, on loan from Internacional.

Club career
Born in Porto Alegre, Rio Grande do Sul, Peglow joined Internacional's youth setup in 2011, aged just nine. In April 2018, he signed his first professional deal at the age of 16.

In October 2019, after impressing with the national team, Peglow was promoted to the first team for the following season, and further extended his contract until December 2023 on 1 January 2020. He made his senior debut on 25 July, coming on as a second-half substitute for Marcos Guilherme in a 1–1 Campeonato Gaúcho away draw against Esportivo.

On 14 July 2021, Peglow joined Liga Portugal 2 side Porto B on a season-long loan deal with an option to buy.

International career
Peglow appeared with Brazil under-16 football team in the 2018 Montaigu Tournament, scoring three goals in four matches. He also was an undisputed starter for the under-17s, playing 17 matches and scoring seven goals while also lifting the 2019 FIFA U-17 World Cup.

Career statistics

Notes

References

External links
Internacional profile 

2002 births
Living people
Footballers from Porto Alegre
Brazilian footballers
Association football midfielders
Sport Club Internacional players
Atlético Clube Goianiense players
FC Porto B players
SC Dnipro-1 players
Campeonato Brasileiro Série A players
Liga Portugal 2 players
Brazil youth international footballers
Brazilian expatriate footballers
Brazilian expatriate sportspeople in Portugal
Expatriate footballers in Portugal
Brazilian expatriate sportspeople in Ukraine
Expatriate footballers in Ukraine